Garvand, may refer to the following settlements in Iran and Azerbaijan:

Garvand, Kermanshah
Garvand, South Khorasan

 Qərvənd, Agdam, Azerbaijan
 Qərvənd, Fizuli, Azerbaijan
 Xan Qərvənd, Goranboy, Azerbaijan

See also
Garavand (disambiguation)